Klaus Ampler (15 November 1940 – 6 May 2016) was a German cyclist. His sporting career began with SC DHfK Leipzig. He competed for East Germany in the team time trial at the 1968 Summer Olympics. He won the peace race in 1963. Ampler died at a nursing home in Leipzig on 6 May 2016 at the age of 75. He was the father of Uwe Ampler, who became a professional cyclist and was coached by his father in the 1980s.

Books
Klaus Ampler: Schweiß. Autobiographie. Gotha, 2005, . (German)

References

External links
 

1940 births
2016 deaths
People from Malbork
People from West Prussia
Socialist Unity Party of Germany members
East German male cyclists
Olympic cyclists of East Germany
Cyclists at the 1968 Summer Olympics
East German sportspeople in doping cases
Recipients of the Patriotic Order of Merit in gold
Recipients of the Banner of Labor
Recipients of the Medal of Merit of the GDR
Cyclists from Saxony
Sportspeople from Leipzig
People from Bezirk Leipzig